Al-Dhubi, Al-Dubi ( Dhubī), or the Dhubi Sheikhdom ( Mashyakhat ad-Dhubī), was a small state in the British Aden Protectorate. Dhubi was located between Mawsata in the southwest, Hadrami in the northeast, Lower Yafa in the south and Upper Yafa in the north.

Its last sheikh was deposed in 1967 upon the founding of the People's Republic of South Yemen and the area is now part of the Republic of Yemen.

History
Al-Dhubi was one of the five sheikhdoms of Upper Yafa.

It entered into a protectorate treaty with Britain on 11 May 1903.

It was part nominally of the Western Aden Protectorate.

Al-Dhubi never joined the Federation of South Arabia, but became part of the Protectorate of South Arabia between 1963 and 1967.

Rulers
Al-Dhubi was ruled by sheikhs who bore the title Shaykh al-Mashyakha ad-Dhubiyya.

Sheikhs 
c.1750 - 1780              Muhammad 
c.1780 - 1810              Jabir ibn Muhammad 
c.1810 - 1840              `Atif ibn Jabir 
c.1840 - 1870              Ahmad ibn `Atif 
c.1870 - 1900              Salih ibn Ahmad ibn `Atif Jabir 
1900 - 1915                Muhammad ibn Muthana ibn `Atif Jabir  
Together with `Umar ibn Muthana ibn `Atif Jabir 
1915 - 1946 Both previous rulers jointly with Salim ibn Salih ibn `Atif Jabir 
1946 - 1967                `Abd al-Rahman ibn Salih

See also
Aden Protectorate
Upper Yafa

References

External links
Map of Arabia (1905-1923) including the states of Aden Protectorate

Former countries in the Middle East
States in the Aden Protectorate
Federation of South Arabia
Former monarchies
Former British protectorates